Ling Liong Sik (born 18 September 1943) is a retired Malaysian politician. He was the sixth president of the Malaysian Chinese Association (MCA), a component party of Barisan Nasional (BN) coalition and also the former Malaysian Minister for Transport. Malaysian Prime Minister Najib Razak filed the suit against Ling Liong Sik on 2015, alleging that Ling had made libellous remarks against him in an article carried on a news portal.

He is the current chancellor and former chairman of the Universiti Tunku Abdul Rahman (UTAR). UTAR's Dewan Tun Dr. Ling Liong Sik is named in honour after him.

In 27 October 2015, Prime Minister Najib Razak is suing Ling Liong Sik for allegedly implying that he had misused public fund for his personal interests. In 22 May 2018, Najib has withdrawn his defamation suit against Ling Liong Sik over the alleged misuse of public funds.

He is also one of the most influential Chinese politicians in contemporary Malaysia.

Personal life
Ling was born on September 18, 1943 at Kuala Kangsar, Perak, Federated Malay States. He received his primary education at King Edward VII School in Taiping, Perak from 1950 to 1957, and his secondary education at the Royal Military College in Port Dickson, Negri Sembilan from 1958 to 1960. Ling went on to pursue his higher education at the University of Singapore in 1961, graduating with a MBBS medical degree in 1966. His first post-varsity occupation involved a move to the Pearl of the Orient, where he was stationed as a physician in Penang General Hospital from 1966 to 1968. Ling later left the hospital to set up his own private practice in Butterworth, Province Wellesley from 1968 to 1975.

He is married to Toh Puan Ong Ee Nah and has two sons: Ling Hee Leong and Ling Hee Keat.

Education
Ling studied in Royal Military College (Malaysia) in 1956. He graduated as a medical doctor from University of Singapore in 1966. Subsequently, he set up his practice in Penang.

Political career
 
In 1974, he was elected as Member of Parliament for Mata Kuching, Penang. He successfully defended his position in 1978 and 1982. He was elected Member of Parliament for Labis, Johor in 1986. He also subsequently successfully defended his position in the 1990, 1995 and 1999 general elections.

He was elected in 1986 as the sixth President of the MCA; he held this position for almost 17 years until 2003.

In 1986, he was appointed Transport Minister. Prior to that, he had held the position of Parliamentary Secretary to the Ministry of Local Government and Federal Territory, Deputy Information Minister, Deputy Finance Minister and Deputy Education Minister.

He was the Minister of Transport of Malaysia from 7 January 1986 till 25 May 2003.

Acting Prime Minister
In 1988, Ling was briefly the Acting Prime Minister (from 4 February 1988 to 16 February 1988), due to an internal struggle between different factions in UMNO, leading to a legal challenge and the deregistration of UMNO.

UTAR chancellor
On 18 January 2017, Ling Liong Sik was installed as University Tunku Abdul Rahman's (UTAR) first chancellor during the university's 24th convocation ceremony.

Najib Razak defamation case
 
On 27 October 2015, Prime Minister Najib Razak has filed a suit against Ling Liong Sik for allegedly defaming him. Ling Liong Sik had made remarks in an article entitled "MCA's Liong Sik joins call for Najib's ouster for allegedly putting people's money in his own pocket" which were published in the Malay Mail online portal. Ling Liong Sik was quoted saying in the article that he agreed with former prime minister Mahathir Mohamad's demands for Najib to resign, claiming that Najib "has taken people's money and put it in his own personal accounts".

On 13 January 2016, Najib said Ling Liong Sik did not act as a bona fide "elder statesman". In his reply to Ling's defence and counter-claim against his suit for defamation, Najib said Ling had acted recklessly and with mala fide (bad intention) to tarnish his image and reputation. 

On 18 July 2016, The High Court in Kuala Lumpur dismissed former Prime Minister Mahathir Mohamad's affidavit in support of Ling Liong Sik's application to strike out Najib's suit. In her decision made in chambers, Justice Nor Bee Ariffin considered the affidavit filed by Mahathir as hearsay.

On 23 December 2016, The High Court fixed March 23, 2017, to decide on an application by Ling Liong Sik to strike out a suit filed against him by Najib.

On 22 February 2017, the court deferred a decision on the application, on the grounds that Najib could sue in his capacity as a public official.

On 8 January 2018, The High Court in Kuala Lumpur has postponed the hearing of the defamation suit brought by Najib against Ling Liong Sik. According to Najib's lawyer Nor Emelia Iszeham , the court has yet to dispose of Ling's application to strike out the suit, filed in February 2016, which will push the hearing to April 2018.

On 16 March 2018, Ling Liong Sik has failed to strike out the suit filed by Najib. Kuala Lumpur High Court judge Justice Nor Bee Arifin said the matter should go on trial to see whether Najib has the legal standing in the suit. 

On 22 May 2018, Najib has withdrawn his defamation suit against Ling Liong Sik over the alleged misuse of public funds. Ling's lawyer Ranjit Singh told reporters after meeting High Court judicial commissioner Goon Siew Chye in chambers that Najib decided to withdraw the suit against his client and the court ordered him to pay a RM25,000 in costs.

Political positions
In 18 February 2016, Ling Liong Sik spared no bullets in his latest attack on Prime Minister Najib Razak. According to Ling, there is nothing wrong with UMNO and BN.

Election results

Honours

Honours of Malaysia
  :
  Grand Commander of the Order of Loyalty to the Crown of Malaysia (SSM) – Tun (2004)
  :
 Knight Commander of the Order of the Perak State Crown (DPMP) – Dato’ (1982)
  Knight Grand Commander of the Order of the Perak State Crown (SPMP) – Dato’ Seri (1989)
  :
  Knight Commander of the Order of the Crown of Selangor (DPMS) – Dato’ (1992)
  :
  Grand Commander of the Exalted Order of Malacca (DGSM) – Datuk Seri (1993)
  :
  Knight Commander of the Most Exalted Order of the Star of Sarawak (PNBS)  – Dato Sri (2003)

See also
 Mata Kuching (federal constituency)
 Labis (federal constituency)

References

Living people
Government ministers of Malaysia
Malaysian politicians of Chinese descent
1943 births
People from Perak
People from Kuala Kangsar
Presidents of Malaysian Chinese Association
Members of the Dewan Rakyat
Malaysian medical doctors
University of Singapore alumni
Grand Commanders of the Order of Loyalty to the Crown of Malaysia
Transport ministers of Malaysia
Knights Commander of the Most Exalted Order of the Star of Sarawak
Knights Commander of the Order of the Crown of Selangor